Data query language (DQL) is part of the base grouping of SQL sub-languages. These sub-languages are mainly categorized into four categories: a data query language (DQL), a data definition language (DDL), a data control language (DCL), and a data manipulation language (DML). Sometimes a transaction control language (TCL) is argued to be part of the sub-language set as well.
 
DQL statements are used for performing queries on the data within schema objects. The purpose of DQL commands is to get the schema relation based on the query passed to it.

Although often considered part of DML, the SQL SELECT statement is strictly speaking an example of DQL. When adding FROM or WHERE data manipulators to the SELECT statement the statement is then considered part of the DML.

Related language types
 Data definition language
 Data manipulation language
 Data control language
 Transactional control language

Data modeling
SQL